Kashtan is a surname. Notable people with the surname include:
Dror Kashtan (born 1944), Israeli footballer and manager
Nikita Kashtan (born 2003), Russian footballer
William Kashtan (1909–1993), general secretary of the Communist Party of Canada

Other uses
 In Russian, the word "Kashtan" (Каштан) means "chestnut".
 Kashtan CIWS (close-in weapon system) is a Russian anti-air system mainly used on naval ships or stationary turrets.

See also